Den sommeren jeg fylte 15 is a 1976 Norwegian drama film directed by Knut Andersen, starring Steffen Rothschild, and music composed by Eyvind Solås. The film is based on Knut Faldbakken's novel Insektsommer (Insect Summer). Peter (Rothschild), who was a teenager in the 1950s, is reminiscing about the days of his youth, and his awakening sexuality.

External links
 
 
 Cellofan – med døden til følge at the Norwegian Film Institute

1976 films
1976 drama films
Films directed by Knut Andersen
Norwegian drama films
Teensploitation
1970s Norwegian-language films

no: